The Maj. James Alexander Tappan House is a historic house at 727 Columbia Street in Helena, Arkansas.  It is a -story wood-frame structure, built in 1892 for James Tappan, a wealthy businessman from a prominent local family.  The house is a fine Queen Anne Victorian, with a particularly elaborate porch with a spindled balustrade and delicately proportioned columns, which wraps around a turreted projection with a conical roof.  The cornice is decorated with brackets and panels, and the exterior also features the use of decoratively-cut shingles.  James Tappan operated a number of businesses, including coal supply and a hardware store, and was director of a local bank.

The house was listed on the National Register of Historic Places in 1974.

See also
National Register of Historic Places listings in Phillips County, Arkansas

References

Houses on the National Register of Historic Places in Arkansas
Queen Anne architecture in Arkansas
Houses completed in 1892
Houses in Phillips County, Arkansas
National Register of Historic Places in Phillips County, Arkansas
Historic district contributing properties in Arkansas